The Toronto International Film Festival Award for Best Canadian Short Film, formerly also known as the NFB John Spotton Award, is an annual film award, presented by the Toronto International Film Festival to a film judged to be the best Canadian short film of the festival. As of 2017, the award is sponsored by International Watch Company and known as the "IWC Short Cuts Award for Best Canadian Short Film".

Winners

References

Best Canadian Short Film
Short film awards